Fidel Ronquillo Nemenzo is a Filipino mathematician and professor serving as chancellor of the University of the Philippines Diliman since 2020.

His areas of expertise include number theory, elliptic curves, and coding theory. He earned his bachelor's degree in mathematics from UP Diliman while his master's and Doctor of Science degrees are from Sophia University in Tokyo, Japan.

Career
On March 2, 2020, he succeeded  Michael Tan and became the eleventh Chancellor of the University of the Philippines Diliman. Immediately prior to his appointment, he was vice chancellor for Research and Development of UP Diliman and is the convenor of the Center for Integrative Development Studies' Data Science for Public Policy Program. He chairs the Mathematics Division of the National Research Council of the Philippines, having been elected to the NRCP Governing Board in 2019. He was Associate Dean for Academic Affairs of the UP Diliman College of Science and headed its Science and Society Program.  Nemenzo also served as President of both the Southeast Asian Mathematical Society (2010-2012) and the Mathematical Society of the Philippines (2004-2010).

Family
Nemenzo is the son of political scientist and former UP president Francisco Nemenzo Jr. His grandfather, Francisco Nemenzo Sr., was Professor of Zoology and Dean of the UP College of Arts and Sciences in the 1960s, who did pioneering work in the study of corals. Nemenzo  is married to Dr. Ma. Victoria Raquiza, professor at the UP National College of Public Administration and Governance. Their son, Julio Anton Mulawin, graduated from the UP School of Economics in 2020.

Awards 
Nemenzo's awards include OneUP Professorial Chair awards and International Publication Awards which he received from the University of the Philippines System; the Achievement Award in Mathematics from the National Research Council of the Philippines in 2013; and the Gawad Chancellor Para sa Pinakamahusay na Guro, which he received from the University of the Philippines Diliman in 2005.

Political activism 

The son of Martial Law era activist and later University of the Philippines President Francisco Nemenzo Jr, he has himself had a long history of political activism. He was a member of the Student Christian Movement of the Philippines.

A UP student leader during the time of martial law under Ferdinand Marcos, he was shot in the back during the infamous Welcome Rotonda rally shootings of September 27, 1984 and almost died from the single M-16 bullet that pierced through his body.  Fellow activists attribute his survival from his wounds to the fact that he was a runner. He was known for his athleticism and healthy lifestyle in the campus.

He was also a founding member of the activist musical group "Patatag".

In recent years, he has strongly denounced the red tagging of UP students who have taken a stand against authoritarianism in the Philippines.

On January 19, 2020, he spoke at the protest demonstration against the Department of National Defense (DND)'s unilateral termination of the 1989 UP-DND Accord which requires the police and military to notify UP officials before they enter UP campuses. During the protest, he declared that academic freedom and "UP as a safe space and a zone for free thought and free speech" have to be defended at all times.

See also 
 Michael Tan
 Francisco Nemenzo Jr.
 Martial law under Ferdinand Marcos
 Protest art against the Marcos dictatorship
 Red-tagging in the Philippines

External links 
 2017 TEDx Talk "Math is Language, Tool, and a Way of Seeing"

References 

Living people
University of the Philippines Diliman alumni
Sophia University alumni
Academic staff of the University of the Philippines
Year of birth missing (living people)